Sahamongkol Film International Co. Ltd. (also Sahamongkolfilm, Mongkol Film or SM) is a Thai motion picture production and distribution company. It is the leading movie company in Thailand, ahead of GMM Grammy's GDH 559, Five Star Production and RS Film.

The company is privately owned and run by its founder and chief executive, Somsak Techaratanaprasert, who is also known as "Sia Jiang". The company's films include the international hit martial arts films Ong-Bak: Muay Thai Warrior, Tom-Yum-Goong and Chai Lai, and the Nak animated movie, as well as recent romantic comedy hit drama film First Love. It distributes foreign films in Thailand through its Mongkol Major distribution company.

In the 1980s, after the Thai government relaxed import tax policies on cultural imports, Sahamongkol became the primary Thai distributor of major American film studios at the time, which included TriStar Pictures, New Line Cinema, De Laurentiis Entertainment Group & Orion Pictures.

External links
 
 IMDb: Sahamongkol Film International

 
Film production companies of Thailand
Companies based in Bangkok
Entertainment companies established in 1970
Mass media companies established in 1970
1970 establishments in Thailand
Privately held companies